The Jiujiang–Quzhou railway is an electrified railway in China.

History
The railway opened on 28 December 2017.

Stations
The line has the following passenger stations:
Quzhou (interchange with the Quzhou–Ningde railway, Shanghai–Kunming high-speed railway, and the Shanghai–Kunming railway)
Changshan
Kaihua
Dexing East
Wuyuan (interchange with the Hefei–Fuzhou high-speed railway)
Jingdezhen North (interchange with the Nanchang–Huangshan high-speed railway)
Poyang
Duchang
Hukou (interchange with the Tongling–Jiujiang railway)
Pipahu
Jiujiang (interchange with the Tongling–Jiujiang railway, Wuhan–Jiujiang railway, Nanchang–Jiujiang intercity railway, Hefei–Jiujiang railway, and the Beijing–Kowloon railway)

References

Railway lines in China
Railway lines opened in 2017